Kathryn J. Moore is a Canadian-born American cell biologist who is the Jean and David Blechman Professor of Cardiology and the founding director of the Cardiovascular Research Center at the New York University Grossman School of Medicine. Moore's research considers the pathogenesis of atherosclerosis, with a focus on the identification of novel therapeutic targets. She was elected Fellow of the National Academy of Sciences in 2021.

Early life and education 
Kathryn Moore was born in Montreal, Quebec, Canada, where she attended McGill University. Moore studied microbiology, receiving her BSc (Distinction) from McGill University in 1989. She remained there for graduate studies, studying mechanisms by which the intracellular pathogen Leishmania donovani subverts macrophage microbicidal functions, under the Canadian immunologist Greg Matlashewski.  Moore was awarded her PhD in Parasitology in 1994.

Research and career 
Moore joined the Harvard Medical School faculty as an Instructor in Medicine in 1999 and was promoted to Assistant Professor in 2002. Her early research focused on innate immune mechanisms of chronic inflammation in age-related diseases such as atherosclerosis and Alzheimer’s Disease.

In 2009, Moore was recruited to the New York University Langone Medical Center, where she continued to focus on origins of cardiovascular and metabolic diseases, in particular the roles that chronic inflammation and lipid dysregulation play in these processes. She contributed to seminal studies showing that cholesterol crystals in atherosclerotic plaques cause lysosomal damage that activates the NLRP3 inflammasome to promote the maturation and release of interleukin-1b.

Awards and honors 
 2003 Ellison Medical Foundation New Scholar in Aging Award
 2006 Claflin Distinguished Scholar Award
 2009 American Heart Association Special Recognition Award in Vascular Biology
 2012 Jeffrey M. Hoeg Award for Basic Science and Clinical Research
 2021 Elected Fellow of the National Academy of Sciences

References 

Living people
Year of birth missing (living people)
Canadian microbiologists
New York University faculty
Members of the United States National Academy of Sciences
McGill University alumni
American microbiologists
American Heart Association
Harvard Medical School people
New York University Grossman School of Medicine faculty
New York University